A Shocking Accident is a 1982 British short comedy film directed by James Scott and produced by Christine Oestreicher, based on Graham Greene's short story by the same name. In 1983, Oestreicher won the Oscar for Best Live Action Short at the 55th Academy Awards.

Cast
 Rupert Everett as Jerome and Mr. Weathersby
 Jenny Seagrove as Sally
 Barbara Hicks as Aunt Joyce
 Benjamin Whitrow as Headmaster
 Tim Seeley as Stephen
 Richenda Carey as Susan
 Sophie Ward as Amanda
 Sarah Elliott as Brenda
 Daniel Chatto as Paul
 Katherine Best as Italian Girl
 Oliver Blackburn as Jerome (aged 9)
 Robert Popper as Jerome (aged 13)
 Timothy Stark as Kingsley
 Luke Taylor as Taylor
 Gary Russell as School Captain

References

External links
 

1982 films
1982 comedy films
1982 short films
British independent films
British comedy short films
Films based on short fiction
Films based on works by Graham Greene
Live Action Short Film Academy Award winners
1980s English-language films
1980s British films